The Sell Out may refer to:

 The Sell Out (film)
 The Sell Out (The Avengers)